Kendra Lee Daly is an oceanographer known for her work on zooplankton, particularly in low oxygen regions of the ocean. She is a professor at the University of South Florida, and an elected fellow of the American Association for the Advancement of Science.

Education and career 
Daly has a B.S. (1973) and a M.S. (1990) from the University of Washington. In 1995 she earned her Ph.D. from the University of Tennessee with a dissertation on zooplankton in the Arctic. Following her Ph.D. she did postdoctoral work at Oak Ridge National Laboratory and was a program director at the National Science Foundation. In 2001 she moved to the University of South Florida where she was promoted to professor in 2014.

Research 
Daly's early research was conducted in the Weddell Sea where she examined the abundance, growth, and feeding of krill. Subsequently she examined year-to-year changes in the development of krill in Antarctica, and the role of zooplankton in organic sulfur cycling in the Southern Ocean. She has examined how plankton production is impacted by physics and biology, such as her work looking at carbon and nitrogen cycling in polar regions. Following the Deepwater Horizon oil spill, Daly considered how the spill may have altered plankton production in the region, worked with a team tracking oil droplets in the water using automated image analysis, and assessed potential toxic effects of the oil on the biological community in the Gulf of Mexico.

Selected publications

Awards and honors 
In 2015 Daly was named a fellow of the American Association for the Advancement of Science.

References

External links 

 

Living people
Women climatologists
Fellows of the American Association for the Advancement of Science
University of Washington alumni
University of Tennessee alumni
University of South Florida faculty
Year of birth missing (living people)